As Long as There Are Pretty Girls (German: Solang' es hübsche Mädchen gibt) is a 1955 West German musical comedy film directed by Arthur Maria Rabenalt and starring Georg Thomalla, Alice Kessler and Ellen Kessler.  It was based on the play Okay Mama by Annemarie Artinger. It was shot at the Bavaria Studios and Carlton Studios in Munich. The film's sets were designed by the art directors Kurt Herlth and Robert Herlth.

Cast
 Georg Thomalla as 	Ernst
 Alice Kessler as Alice
 Ellen Kessler as Ellen
 Grethe Weiser as Erna Lerch
 Rudolf Vogel as 	Herr Lerch
 Irene Mann as 	Monika
 Oskar Sima as 	Colonel
 Blandine Ebinger as 	Frau Otto
 John W. Bubbles as 	Self 
 Robert Cunningham as 	Bob

References

Bibliography
 Bock, Hans-Michael & Bergfelder, Tim. The Concise CineGraph. Encyclopedia of German Cinema. Berghahn Books, 2009.
 Goble, Alan. The Complete Index to Literary Sources in Film. Walter de Gruyter, 1999.

External links 
 

1955 films
1955 musical films
German musical films
West German films
1950s German-language films
1950s German films
Films directed by Arthur Maria Rabenalt
Gloria Film films
Films shot at Bavaria Studios

de:Solang' es hübsche Mädchen gibt